Neil Matterson may refer to:
 Neil Matterson (rower)
 Neil Matterson (rugby league)